In mathematics, a Barnes zeta function is a generalization of the Riemann zeta function introduced by . It is further generalized by the Shintani zeta function.

Definition
The Barnes zeta function is defined by

 
where w and aj have positive real part and s has real part greater than N.

It has a meromorphic continuation to all complex s, whose only singularities are simple poles at s = 1, 2, ..., N.  For N = w = a1 = 1 it is the Riemann zeta function.

References

Zeta and L-functions